Nekweaga Bay Airport  is located adjacent to Nekweaga Bay on Wollaston Lake in the Canadian province of Saskatchewan. It is a private airport that services Wilderness Family Outfitters.

See also 
 List of airports in Saskatchewan

References 

Registered aerodromes in Saskatchewan